The Architects Act was amended in 2008 by a statutory instrument made by a minister of the United Kingdom government under the European Communities Act 1972.  This was the Architects (Recognition of European Qualifications etc and Saving and Transitional Provision) Regulations 2008, which came into force on 20 June 2008.  An Explanatory Memorandum was issued with the Regulations and a fuller Explanatory Memorandum presented to Parliament.

The Architects Act 1997 had resulted from the policy of allowing certain restrictions to apply (for well over 60 years, in the United Kingdom) to the use of the simple word "architect" in connection with a statutory Register of Architects operated under Westminster primary legislation by which the executant body was renamed as the Architects Registration Board from 1997 (previously the Architects' Registration Council of the United Kingdom).  The amendment (under the European Communities Act 1972) has introduced pages of complicated text to a piece of legislation which was otherwise tolerably trim, neat and comprehensible in its consolidated form in the 1997 Act.  But the amendment has been made pursuant to a European Directive made in 2005 and the treaty obligations binding upon the United Kingdom and other states of the European Union, and in that respect an amendment under the European Directive was inevitable.

Non-departmental public body

The Architects Registration Board has been assigned the function of the "competent authority" which has to be designated by every European Union state. It has been classed as a "non-departmental public body" in the language being used by government departments.  The majority of the Board is appointed by one such government department under the provisions of the Architects Act 1997.

Impact

In connection with architects registration in the United Kingdom it is likely that as a result of the amendment of 2008 there will be a commensurate need to expand the human and other resources employed for giving effect to the additional activity prescribed for the Architects Registration Board to perform; and that the impact upon the annual fee which the Act enables the Board to demand is unlikely to be favourable to architects in the United Kingdom who, by application or retention, choose to become registrants on what, by the amendment, has become "Part 1" of the Register. The general effect on teaching and practice, or on the inter-disciplinary process in the service of the built environment, is uncertain.  Independent observers may consider (as had the author of the Warne Report, concerning the reform of architects registration which preceded the amending legislation of 1996) that the public is best served by means of statutory regulations of universal application (such as Building Regulations) on the one hand and arrangements free from the taint of monopoly on the other (for which see the article on the Warne Report and the legislative changes concerning trade descriptions and consumer protection, introduced in May 2008, that are referred to in the article on Architects Registration in the United Kingdom).

References

Registration of architects in the United Kingdom
Architectural education
Statutory Instruments of the United Kingdom
2008 in British law